Bert Biscoe is a Cornish politician, historian and bard of the Cornish Gorseth also known by the bardic name Viajor Gans Geryow. He represented Cornwall Council's Truro Boscawen District as an independent Cornwall Councillor until May 2019 and is still serving as an independent Truro City Council councillor for the new Boscawen & Redannick ward. Bert Biscoe is known locally for his work as a local historian and for his activism related to the Cornish identity debate. In 2012, his book of poems called "Trurra" won a Waterstones Publishers Award at the Holyer An Gof literary competition. Biscoe was made Mayor of Truro 2020/21 in an online ceremony.

Personal life
Bert Biscoe was born in Stithians, Cornwall. He attended Truro School and his higher education was completed at Bangor University. He lives in Truro, Cornwall.

Bardic work
Bert Biscoe is a traditional musician and poet, specialising in Cornish folk music, some of which is in the Cornish language. Some of his audio works have been collected into a compilation titled "An Kynsa".

He was created a Bard of the Cornish Gorsedh in 1995 for services to Cornwall with the bardic name Viajor Gans Geryow, and has been a member of the Council of the Gorsedh since 2009. He is the author of several books of poetry. As a bard of the Gorsedh he is regularly in attendance at celebrations of Cornish culture and important cultural occasions.

His poetry centres on the 'spirit of Kernow', he has performed with other bards in Cornwall.

Political career
He is an independent councillor in Cornwall Council's Truro Boscawen District. He was also a city councillor on Truro City Council until he lost his seat in the May 2021 elections.

Until 2017, he was Cornwall Council's portfolio holder for transport and was responsible for Cornwall's transport links. He was replaced by Councillor Geoff Brown. During his time in office, he was involved in many projects including the A30 road improvements at Temple, Cornwall, and one of the failed bus lane projects in Truro.

Work as local historian
He is the Chairman of the Truro Civic Society, a registered charity based in Truro, he is also current President of the Truro Old Cornwall Society. He is also the honorary secretary and a trustee on the board on the Royal Cornwall Museum. He is the author of two books about the history of Cornwall.

Activism
Bert Biscoe is a relevant figure in the Cornish Identity debate and has campaigned for increased powers for Cornish local government and the creation of a Cornish Assembly.
 He has been the chair of the Cornish Constitutional Convention.

Books
Bert Biscoe is the author of several books, mainly related to Cornwall and poetry.
MAUDLIN' PILGRIMAGE, book of verse set in the reign of Henry VIII.
Rebecca, (1996).
The dance of the Cornish air, (1996).
At a wedding with Yeats in Turin, (2003).
Trurra, Published by Dew Vardh, winner of the Waterstones Award at Holyer An Gof Publishers' Awards 2012.
Words of Granite.
Mercifully Preserved Fictional account of the life of Sir John Betjeman
On Yer Trolley: Poems Made During Complete Bed Rest!, (2008).
White Crusted Eyes: Tales of Par, (2009).
MEDITATIONS ON CARN BREA Poems and Pictures from a Cornish Hill, (2005).
Accompanied by Larks.

See also

Truro City Council
Truro Old Cornwall Society
Cornwall Council
Cornish Nationalism
Cornish people
Cornish Gorseth

References

Living people
Alumni of Bangor University
Bards of Gorsedh Kernow
Cornish-speaking people
Members of Cornwall Council
Poets from Cornwall
Year of birth missing (living people)
Politicians from Cornwall
Politics of Truro
Mayors of places in Cornwall
Deputy Lieutenants of Cornwall